Pandebu-Tokpombu is the eighth largest town of Sierra Leone and the second largest in the Kenema District, after its capital Kenema.

The population of the Pandebu-Tokpombu was 20,219 in the 2004 census.

References

Populated places in Sierra Leone
Eastern Province, Sierra Leone